Hanne Verbruggen (born 27 May 1993) is a Belgian long-distance runner. She represented Belgium at the 2020 Summer Olympics in the women's marathon.

Career
In July 2018, Verbruggen competed at the 2018 Belgian Athletics Championships and won a silver medal in the 5,000 metres and gold medal in the 10,000 metres. In August 2019, she competed at the 2019 Belgian Athletics Championships and won a silver medal in the 5000 metres. In August 2020, she competed at the 2020 Belgian Athletics Championships in the 10,000 metres and won a gold medal.

Verbruggen represented Belgium at the 2020 Summer Olympics in the women's marathon and finished in 49th place.

References

External links
 
 
 

1993 births
Living people
Belgian female long-distance runners
Belgian female marathon runners
Olympic athletes of Belgium
Athletes (track and field) at the 2020 Summer Olympics
20th-century Belgian women
21st-century Belgian women